= Laurel Junction, West Virginia =

Laurel Junction
- Unincorporated community
- Location within the state of West Virginia Laurel Junction (the United States)
- Coordinates: 39°11′40″N 81°17′57″W
- Country: United States
- State: West Virginia
- County: Wood
- Elevation: 738 ft (225 m)
- Time zone: UTC-5 (Eastern (EST))
  - Summer (DST): UTC-4 (EDT)
- GNIS ID: 1688994

Laurel Junction was an unincorporated community in Wood County, West Virginia, United States.
